Vocus was a public relations software company based in Beltsville, Maryland, United States, serving clients worldwide from 1992 to 2014. In addition to its web-based PR software suites, the company owns the online publicity services, PRWeb and Help a Reporter Out (HARO). Vocus was founded in 1992 by Rick Rudman and Bob Lentz and was a publicly held company until June 2014 when it was taken private by Chicago-based private equity company GTCR. The company operates additional offices in the United States, Europe and Asia. Since late 2014, the company merged with Cision AB to form Cision Inc. as the succeeding company.

History and acquisitions

Early history 
Vocus Inc. was founded in 1992 by chief executive officer Rick Rudman and his business partner, Bob Lentz. The two had previously been investors at First Data Software Publishing, which they co-founded in 1991 to develop software supporting political organizations' external communications. Rudman and Lentz bought out the firm's other two partners and quit their jobs to relaunch the company as Vocus.

In its early years, Vocus developed software to help political action committees and grassroots organizations track and organize donors and contacts. In 1997, the company expanded its services to offer public relations software, including a product developed specifically for clients outside of the political sector, to help them manage external communications. In 1999, Vocus discontinued the use of packaged software products, choosing instead to offer its software over the Internet.

2000s
During the 2000s, the company continued to expand its public relations services. In October 2002, Vocus announced the release of its application programming interface (API), built using Microsoft XML, which allowed companies to integrate Vocus software with other business productivity applications.

In 2005, Vocus held its initial public offering, selling 5 million shares of stock and raising a total of $45 million. The same year, Vocus was ranked number 50 on Washington Business Journal's list of the fastest growing companies, after its revenue grew 32.5% from 2004 to 2005.

Vocus purchased PRWeb, the press release service, in August 2006 for $28 million in cash and stock. The acquisition allowed Vocus customers to access PRWeb's online press release distribution services. The following year, in 2007, Vocus established a partnership with the Associated Press, allowing Vocus users to distribute press releases within the AP network.

2010 onwards
The company continued to expand through acquisitions from 2010 onward. In 2010, Vocus acquired two software companies offering public relations services similar to Vocus': the French company Datapresse and the Chinese company BDL Media. The same year, the company also acquired the online service Help a Reporter Out (HARO). In February 2011, Vocus announced it had acquired two social media marketing companies, Engine 140, which develops marketing software for use with Twitter, and North Social, developer of Facebook customization software. In 2012, Vocus acquired the email marketing software company, iContact, for $169 million in cash and stock.

Vocus holds an annual users conference. In 2013, the conference was opened up to all industry communication professionals. The "Demand Success" 2013 conference took place June 20 and 21, 2013 and featured keynote speakers Arianna Huffington and Elisabeth Moss (Mad Men). The "Demand Success" 2014 conference took place June 5 and 6, 2013 and featured keynote speakers Randi Zuckerberg, Adrian Grenier and Judy Smith.

In October 14, 2014, Cision and Vocus announced a friendly merger of the two public relations companies. Cision based in Sweden will relocate its headquarters to Chicago and so will Vocus from Maryland. The company is based out of Chicago and the combined entity is known as Cision.

Corporate overview
Vocus was led by chief executive officer, Peter Granat. In 2013, the company reported revenue of $186.9 million, up from $170.0 million in 2012 and $114.8 million in 2011.

The company headquarters are in Beltsville, Maryland. In the United States, Vocus also operates offices in College Park, Maryland; Herndon and Reston, Virginia and Ferndale, Washington.  The company's international headquarters were located in London. As of October 2012, the company employed 1,200 people worldwide, 700 of whom were located in Beltsville.

References

External links
Vocus company website, in the week prior to acquisition by Cision

Companies based in Prince George's County, Maryland
Software companies established in 1992
Beltsville, Maryland
Software companies based in Maryland
Public relations companies of the United States
2014 mergers and acquisitions
Defunct software companies of the United States